Henry Sever DD (died 1471) was an English  medieval divine and educational administrator.

Sever became the senior proctor at  Merton College, Oxford in 1427.
Sever was  the chaplain and almoner of King Henry VI. He was also the first Provost (head school governor) of Eton College, from 1440 to 1442.
He was the Chancellor of Oxford University during 1442–3. He became Prebendary (1445) and then Chancellor (1449) of St Paul's Cathedral in London. From 1455 until his death in 1471, he was the Warden of Merton College, Oxford.

References

Year of birth missing
1471 deaths
English chaplains
English theologians
15th-century English Roman Catholic priests
Provosts of Eton College
Chancellors of the University of Oxford
Wardens of Merton College, Oxford
15th-century English people
15th-century educators
English male non-fiction writers